Voices from Within is the second full-length studio album by Israeli oriental death/doom metal band Distorted, released on April 7, 2008.

Track listing

Credits

Guest musicians
 Sven De Caluwe (Aborted)
 Henrik Jacobsen (Koldborn, Hatesphere)
 Lisa Johansson (Draconian)
 Thomas Vikstrom (Therion)

Release history

References

2008 albums
Distorted albums